Irreligion in the Netherlands pertains to atheism, agnosticism, and other forms of irreligion in the Netherlands. Irreligion is the majority religious position in the country, and the Netherlands is one of the most irreligious countries in the world.

History 

17th century philosopher Baruch Spinoza was an early critic of religious authority in the country. Secularization, and the decline in religiosity, started around 1880 and first became noticeable after 1960 in the Protestant rural areas of Friesland and Groningen. It later spread to Amsterdam, Rotterdam and the other large cities in the west. In the 1970s, the Catholic southern areas started to show religious declines.

After the Second World War, the major religions began to decline, while the previously insignificant religion of Islam began to increase in numbers. During the 1960s and 1970s, pillarization began to weaken and the population became less religious. In 1971, 39% of the Dutch population were members of the Roman Catholic Church; by 2014, their share of the population had dropped to about 23.3%. The proportion of adherents of Protestantism declined in the same period from 31% to 15.5%. A significant percentage of the population adheres to other Protestant churches and the Old Catholic Church.

With only 49.9% of the Dutch adhering to a religion as of 2015, the Netherlands is one of the least religious countries of Europe, after the Czech Republic and Estonia. During the 1960s through 1980s, religion lost its influence on the Dutch politics, and as a result, Dutch policy on abortion, euthanasia, homosexuality and prostitution became very liberal in the following decades.

Humanism 
Research in 2003 shows that about 1.27 million people in the Netherlands express explicitly an affinity with secular humanism, which is about 9.4% of the total population. Erasmus and Coornhert are important early representatives of humanism in the Netherlands in the 16th century. Erasmus translated many classical texts so that they were accessible to a wide audience. In this period, there was still no non-or anti-religion movement. However, there was a sense of free will, own strength and reason. Dirck Coornhert in the Netherlands was one of the first who advocated religious tolerance. He did not derive his morality from the Christian religion, but enunciated that people outside the Christian faith could be virtuous as well.

In the 17th century, Baruch Spinoza and Hugo Grotius advanced humanist ideas. The jurist Hugo Grotius focused on the law relating to war, peace and law. Internationally, he is regarded as the founder of modern human rights. During the Age of Enlightenment, humanist ideas expanded in the Netherlands. The modern organized humanist movement began in the Netherlands in the mid-nineteenth century with the establishment of freethinkers association De Dageraad (Dawn) influenced by writers such as Multatuli and later Anton Constandse. Marxism had a significant influence on the Dutch humanism of the 20th century.

With the establishment of the humanistic associations Humanitas in 1945 and the Humanistisch Verbond in 1946, Dutch humanists organized themselves after the Second World War to fight the still highly compartmentalized pillarized society which was dominated by separate Christians movements in the Netherlands. When the Universal Declaration of Human Rights was adopted by the United Nations in 1948, the Dutch Humanist movements became involved with the establishment of the International Humanist and Ethical Union in 1952 (and since 1990 also the European Humanist Federation).

Demographics 
In December 2014, for the first time there were more atheists (25%) than theists (17%) in the Netherlands, with majorities of the population being agnostic (31%) or spiritual but not religious (27%). In 2016, irreligious people rose to 50% of the population in the Netherlands, and this number rose to a majority of 51% in 2018.

A 2015 survey showed that 63% of Dutch people thought that religion does more harm than good. Not all respondents agreed with the statement that religion does more harm to the same degree. Most respondents (26 percent) agreed "a little". 19% of respondents "agreed" with the statement and another 18% "agreed completely". Atheists (25% of Dutch people) see the most harm in religion. Of this group, 88% agreed that religion does more harm than good. The study showed that the more faithful someone is, the less likely that person is to believe religion does more harm than good. Of the faithful, only 21% believe that religion has a more damaging than beneficial effect. A quarter of the population thinks that morality is threatened if no one believes in God, down from 40% in 2006. The number of people reporting that they never pray rose from 36% in 2006 to 53% in 2016.

See also 

 Catholic Church in the Netherlands
 Demography of the Netherlands
 List of Dutch atheists
 Religion in the Netherlands

References 

Irreligion by country
Religion in the Netherlands
Irreligion in the Netherlands